Neal Huff is an American actor from New York City. In April 2018, he performed as Willie Oban in the Broadway revival of The Iceman Cometh. In December 2018, Huff began performing in To Kill a Mockingbird, adapted for stage by Aaron Sorkin on Broadway at the Shubert Theatre as Link Deas.

Life and career
He received his MFA from the Graduate Acting Program at New York University. He has appeared on Broadway in revivals of The Tempest (1995) and The Lion in Winter (1999) and the Tony Award-winning Take Me Out (2003). Off-Broadway he has appeared in The Foreigner (2004) and The Little Dog Laughed (2006).

On television Huff has been featured in Law & Order, The Wire, Six Degrees, Fringe, The Blacklist, Person of Interest, The Affair, Girls, and Brooklyn Nine-Nine.

Filmography

Film

Television

Stage

References

External links
 
 
 

American male film actors
American male stage actors
American male television actors
Living people
Tisch School of the Arts alumni
Male actors from New York City
Year of birth missing (living people)
21st-century American male actors